The Iron Icon is the second EP by The Clay People, released in August 1995 by record label Re-Constriction Records.

Packaging
The Japanese porcelain artwork was chosen by Re-Constriction Records label owner Chase.

Reception

Jason Anderson of allmusic gave The Iron Icon four out of five stars, calling the music "extremely loud and abusive industrial noise" and "repetitive in sonic texture, lyrical concept, and also in its bludgeoning tone." Aiding & Abetting gave the album a positive review and praised the band's change in artistic direction towards a more heavy metal sound. Sonic Boom credited Daniel Neet's vocals and the album's unique vocal mix as being among the highpoints of the album.

Track listing

Personnel
Adapted from The Iron Icon liner notes.

Clay People
 Alex Eller – keyboards, programming, pre-production
 Brian McGarvey – electric guitar
 Daniel Neet – lead vocals, production
 Will Nivens – drums

Production and design
 Duane Beer – loops, sampler
 Burton C. Bell – backing vocals
 Chase – design
 Van Christie – production
 James Galas – design
 Jason McNinch – production
 Jeff Motch – design
 Mud – sampler, mastering
 Will Nivens – production
 Steven – sampler
 Alex Welz – backing vocals
 Adam Yoffe – production, pre-production

Release history

References

External links 
 The Iron Icon at Discogs (list of releases)

1995 EPs
The Clay People albums
Re-Constriction Records EPs